The Crest is the summit, 125 m, of a moraine just east of Lake Boeckella and 0.5 nautical miles (0.9 km) south of Hut Cove, Hope Bay, on Trinity Peninsula. Mapped in 1945 and 1948 by the Falkland Islands Dependencies Survey (FIDS). The feature marks the summit of the initial steep slope up from the FIDS station at Hope Bay. The name originated locally in about 1945.

Crest, The